Karen Slowing-Aceituno (born 22 December 1968) is a Guatemalan former swimmer who competed in the 1984 Summer Olympics. She competed in the freestyle swimming at 100 metres, 400 m and 800 m.

She is the cousin of Melanie Slowing.

Her daughter Valerie Gruest was an Olympic swimmer in 2016 at 400 and 800 m freestyle.

References

1968 births
Living people
Guatemalan female swimmers
Guatemalan female freestyle swimmers
Female butterfly swimmers
Olympic swimmers of Guatemala
Swimmers at the 1984 Summer Olympics